Mount Dorman is a  mountain summit located in British Columbia, Canada. Precipitation runoff from the mountain drains west to the White River via Elk Creek, principally.

Etymology

The mountain was presumably named in the mid-1950s by the Forest Service after Bill Dorman, trapper along the nearby White River from the early 1900s through the 1920s. The mountain's toponym was officially adopted March 3, 1960, by the Geographical Names Board of Canada.

Climate

Based on the Köppen climate classification, Mount Dorman is located in a subarctic climate zone with cold, snowy winters, and mild summers. Winter temperatures can drop below −20 °C with wind chill factors below −30 °C.

See also

Geography of British Columbia

References

External links
 Mount Dorman: Weather forecast

Two-thousanders of British Columbia
Rocky Mountains
Kootenay Land District